The Rumaldo Chavez House is a historic house located north of Albuquerque, New Mexico, in the unincorporated village of Alameda. The date of construction is unknown but it was probably built in the 1860s or earlier, possibly by Rumaldo Chavez, whose family lived in Alameda since at least the 1840s. By 1927, his daughter-in-law Aurelia H. de Chavez was listed as the owner. The house was added to the New Mexico State Register of Cultural Properties and the National Register of Historic Places in 1980. It is located immediately to the east of another historic building, the Domingo Tafoya House.

It contains six rooms arranged in an L shape. Five of the rooms probably date to the original construction of the house and have ceilings with exposed vigas, plank floors, and separate exterior doorways. Most of the windows are 1-over-1 wood-framed sash windows and probably date to the late 1800s.

References

External links

Houses in Bernalillo County, New Mexico
Houses on the National Register of Historic Places in New Mexico
New Mexico State Register of Cultural Properties
National Register of Historic Places in Bernalillo County, New Mexico